Lepisanthes multijuga is a species of flowering plant, a tropical forest fruit-tree in the lychee family, that is native to Southeast Asia.

Description
The species grows as a shrub or small tree, often multistemmed, to 5–12 m in height. The pinnate leaves have 12–30 pairs of sessile, linear to lance-shaped leaflets. The terminal inflorescences bear reddish flowers. The oval fruits are drupes 2–3 cm long by 1.3–2 cm in diameter, yellow to brownish-orange when ripe, each containing one or two seeds in an edible, sweet, translucent mesocarp.

Distribution and habitat
The species is endemic to Borneo. It occurs in mixed hill forest up to an elevation of 1,000 m.

References

 
multijuga
Endemic flora of Borneo
Fruits originating in Asia
Plants described in 1860
Taxa named by Joseph Dalton Hooker
Flora of the Borneo lowland rain forests